Rikken may refer to:

Rikken Dōshikai, Japanese political party active in the early years of the 20th century
Rikken Kaishintō, political party in Meiji period Japan
Rikken Kokumintō, political party in Meiji period Japan
Rikken Minseito, one of the main political parties in pre-war Japan
Rikken Seiyūkai, one of the main political parties in pre-war Japan
Rikken Teiseitō, short-lived conservative political party in Meiji period Japan
Rikken Minshutō, a 21st-century Japanese liberal political party

See also 
Rikke
Rikki (name)